Hatherton Glacier is a large glacier flowing from the Antarctic polar plateau generally eastward along the south side of the Darwin Mountains and entering Darwin Glacier at Junction Spur. It was mapped by the Darwin Glacier Party of the Commonwealth Trans-Antarctic Expedition (1956–58), and was named for Trevor Hatherton, Scientific Officer in Charge of Antarctic Activities at the Department of Scientific and Industrial Research, Wellington, New Zealand.

See also
 List of glaciers in the Antarctic
 Glaciology

Further reading 
 Gunter Faure, Teresa M. Mensing, The Transantarctic Mountains: Rocks, Ice, Meteorites and Water, PP 298, 392, 663
 Charles Swithinbank, Antarctica, Issue 1386, Part 2, P 26
 METTE K. GILLESPIE, WENDY LAWSON, WOLFGANG RACK, BRIAN ANDERSON, DONALD D. BLANKENSHIP, DUNCAN A. YOUNG, JOHN W. HOLT, Geometry and ice dynamics of the Darwin–Hatherton glacial system, Transantarctic Mountains, Journal of Glaciology, Volume 63, Issue 242, December 2017, pp. 959–972
 Courtney King, Dr. Brenda Hall, Trevor Hillebrand, and Dr. John Stone, History of Grounded Ice in the Ross Embayment since the Last Glacial Maximum Using the Glacial Geology Alongside the Hatherton and Darwin Glacier system, Antarctica, Climate Change Institute, University of Maine

References

Glaciers of Oates Land